FC Aarau is a Swiss football club which are based in Aarau. during the 2014/15 campaign they will be participating in the Swiss Super League, Schweizer Pokal.

Competitions

Friendly matches

Preseason

Mid-season (fall)

Winter break

Swiss Super League

Swiss Cup

External links
Official Website 
FC Aarau Unofficial Forum 
Szene Aarau 
FC Aarau Ladies Team 
Soccerway profile
Just Cant Beat That profile

Swiss football clubs 2014–15 season
FC Aarau seasons